This is a list of the Romania national football team results from 1960 to 1979.

1960

1961

1962

1963

1964

1965

1966

1967

1968

1969

1970

1971

1972

1973

1974

1975

1976

1977

1978

1979

References

All details are sourced to the match reports cited, unless otherwise specified:

External links
Romanian Football Federation
World Referee - Matches featuring Romania
EU-Football - international football match results of Romania 1922-present

Romania national football team results